Compañía de Tropas de Operaciones Especiales (Special Operations Troops Company, TOE) is the premier special operations force of the Santa Fe Province Police, Argentina.

The service was created on 4 May 1990, and depends directly of the Chief of the Province Police. Agents of the unit were heavily trained in different international centers, such as the British NCIS, and the Israel Yamam; also its personnel have received specialized formation in many Latin American countries.

The TOE uses weapons and gear such as the Bersa Thunder 9 pistol, FMK-3 submachine gun, Steyr AUG SMG 9 mm, FN FAL assault rifle, Ithaca 37 combat shotgun and the Remington 700 sniper rifle.

See also
Scorpion Group
Albatross Group
Hawk Special Operations Brigade
Federal Special Operations Group
Santa Fe Province Police

Provincial law enforcement agencies of Argentina